Twin films are films with the same or similar plots produced and released at the same time by two different film studios. The phenomenon can result from two or more production companies investing in similar scripts at the same time, resulting in a race to distribute the films to audiences. Some attribute twin films to industrial espionage, the movement of staff between studios, or that the same screenplays are sent to several film studios before being accepted. Another possible explanation is if the films deal with topical issues, such as volcanic eruptions, reality television, terrorist attacks, or significant anniversaries, resulting in multiple discovery of the concept.

While twin films are often big budget films, a mockbuster can be made with a low budget, with similar titles, aesthetics, or theme as blockbuster films. Mockbusters are usually given more limited release and marketing, intending to take advantage of the public interest in the topic driven by the major film.

Avoiding twin films
Screenwriter Terry Rossio notes that there are always film projects with similar subjects being developed in multiple studios, and that usually only one of them makes it into production in a given period of time, and therefore twin films are better regarded as exceptions to this tendency. For example, the release of the 2015 Whitey Bulger biopic Black Mass led to the abandonment of a planned film about Bulger that would have been produced by Ben Affleck and Matt Damon.

The 2008 film Who Do You Love?, about American record label Chess Records, had its widespread release delayed until 2010 to avoid competing with Cadillac Records, a higher-budget 2008 film on the same subject.

In one case, for the 1974 film The Towering Inferno, the fear of having competing action thrillers, both set in a burning skyscraper, convinced two Hollywood studios to merge their productions into one (all-star) film.

Notable examples
Notable examples of twin films are included in this list:
|-
| Oblivion
| 2013
| After Earth
| 2013
| Both films include a protagonist who must fight for survival on a post-apocalyptic Earth.
|-
| This Is the End
| 2013
| The World's End
| 2013
| Also Rapture-Palooza (2013); all are apocalyptic comedy films.
|-
| The Double
| 2013
| Enemy
| 2013
| Both are about a man who finds his physical doppelgänger in a seemingly totalitarian state.
|-
| The Machine
| 2013
| Automata
| 2014
| Also Ex Machina (2014), Transcendence (2014), Chappie (2015), and Uncanny (2015). All are science fiction films involving robots and/or artificial intelligence.
|-
| Yves Saint Laurent
| 2014
| Saint Laurent
| 2014
| Both are Yves Saint Laurent biopics.
|-
| Hercules
| 2014
| The Legend of Hercules
| 2014
| Also Hercules Reborn (2014). All are about Hercules.
|-
| The Equalizer
| 2014
| John Wick
| 2014
| Both films involve a highly trained protagonist who seeks vengeance through killing.
|-
| Life After Beth
| 2014
| Burying the Ex
| 2014
| Also Warm Bodies (2013). All three are romantic comedies involving zombies.
|-
| This Is Where I Leave You
| 2014
| August: Osage County
| 2014
| Both movies involve dysfunctional families reuniting after the death of the patriarch.
|-
| Unfriended
| 2014
| Friend Request
| 2016
| Both are horror films with plots centered around social media.
|-
| Labyrinth of Lies
| 2014
| The People vs. Fritz Bauer
| 2015
| Also  (2016). All are films depicting the effort which led to the Frankfurt Auschwitz trials by a group of prosecutors headed by Fritz Bauer.
|-
| Moonwalkers
| 2015
| Operation Avalanche
| 2016
| Both are films based on Moon landing conspiracy theories.
|-
| The Beauty Inside
| 2015
| Every Day
| 2018
| Both are a romance between a woman and a spirit who wakes up every day in a different body.
|-
| Marguerite
| 2015
| Florence Foster Jenkins
| 2016
| Both films are based on Florence Foster Jenkins' life.
|-
| The Martian
| 2015
| Approaching the Unknown
| 2016
| Also Forsaken (2018). Both are about a man who is stranded in space on a mission to Mars and has to figure out a way to survive.
|-
| Spectre
| 2015
| Mission: Impossible – Rogue Nation
| 2015
| Both films feature the protagonists chasing after secret criminal organisations through Austria, Morocco and London while their intelligence agencies are shutting down. Paramount had to advance the release date of Mission: Impossible – Rogue Nation to avoid conflicting with Spectre.
|-
| Coming Through the Rye
| 2015
| Rebel in the Rye
| 2017
| Both are films about J. D. Salinger.
|-
| Other People
| 2016
| The Hollars
| 2016
| Both are about a male writer living in New York City who returns to his hometown for his mother dying of cancer.
|-
| Southside with You
| 2016
| Barry
| 2016
| Both are films about a young Barack Obama, as well as a love interest.
|-
| Christine
| 2016
| Kate Plays Christine
| 2016
| Both are films about Christine Chubbuck, though Kate Plays Christine is a documentary about the acting process.
|-
| Captain Fantastic
| 2016
| The Glass Castle
| 2017
| Both are about a large family who lives secluded from the civilized world and deal with its moral ramifications.
|-
| Anthropoid
| 2016
| The Man with the Iron Heart
| 2017
| Both films are about Operation Anthropoid, the assassination of SS-Obergruppenführer Reinhard Heydrich.
|-
| The Jungle Book
| 2016
| Mowgli: Legend of the Jungle
| 2018
| Both are live-action, CGI-heavy adaptations of Rudyard Kipling's The Jungle Book, though the 2016 film is a remake of the 1967 animated musical film.
|-
| Earthquake
| 2016
| Spitak
| 2018
| Both films are about the 1988 Armenian earthquake.
|-
| Churchill
| 2017
| Darkest Hour
| 2017
| Both are films about Winston Churchill. Also, the TV film Churchill's Secret (2016) is about Winston Churchill.
|-
| Darkest Hour
| 2017
| Dunkirk
| 2017
| Both films are about planning of the evacuation of Dunkirk.
|-
| The Age of Pioneers
| 2017
| Salyut 7
| 2017
| Both Russian films are based on facts and feature Soviet cosmonauts.
|-
| Goodbye Christopher Robin
| 2017
| Christopher Robin
| 2018
| The former is about the life of Winnie-the-Pooh author A. A. Milne's son Christopher Robin. The latter is about the adult life of the book character Christopher Robin, who author A. A. Milne based on his son.
|-
| Crowhurst
| 2017
| The Mercy
| 2018
| Both films are about Donald Crowhurst's ill-fated entry in the Sunday Times Golden Globe Race, a non-stop round-the-world sailing competition. Uniquely, these films not only have an identical subject, but were also distributed by the same studio, namely StudioCanal: according to the head of StudioCanal UK, Danny Perkins, the company bought the low-budget production Crowhurst "so we could control it".
|-
| The Miseducation of Cameron Post
| 2018
| Boy Erased
| 2018
| The protagonists of both films are gay teenagers forced by their families to undergo conversion therapy.
|-
| U – July 22
| 2018
| 22 July
| 2018
| Both are dramas based on the 2011 Utøya, Norway massacre.
|-
| Sink or Swim
| 2018
| Swimming with Men
| 2018
| Both are about a man who is facing a midlife crisis and joins an all-male synchronised swimming team.
|-
| Upgrade
| 2018
| Venom
| 2018
| Both are films about intelligent symbiotes, which are attached to and talk to their human host, giving the human enhanced powers and abilities, but gradually take control of the host. Respective stars Logan Marshall-Green and Tom Hardy also look alike.
|-
| Smallfoot
| 2018
| Abominable
| 2019
| Both are computer-animated films about abominable snowmen making first contact with humans and are both set in the Himalayas.
|-
| Puppet Master: The Littlest Reich
| 2018
| The Happytime Murders
| 2018
| Both are dark comedies featuring puppets.
|-
| A Quiet Place 
| 2018
| The Silence
| 2019
| Both involve the world coming under attack from terrifying creatures who hunt their human prey by sound.
|-
| Beautiful Boy
| 2018
| Ben Is Back
| 2018
| Both are melodramas about a family with a teenage son facing a drug addiction.
|-
| Skate Kitchen
| 2018
| Mid90s
| 2018
| Both are coming of age stories about a group of skateboarding teenagers played by inexperienced actors who skateboard in real life. In both films, the primary character is the newest member of the group and has a contentious relationship with their single mother.
|-
| RBG
| 2018
| On the Basis of Sex
| 2018
| A documentary and a biographical drama about Ruth Bader Ginsburg.
|-
|Won't You Be My Neighbor?
|2018
|A Beautiful Day in the Neighborhood
|2019
|Both films are about Fred Rogers, although the former is a documentary while the latter is a biopic.
|-
| Widows
| 2018
| The Kitchen
| 2019
| Both are about the law-abiding wives of criminals who take up their husbands' criminal plans when they are gone.
|-
| Lez Bomb
|2018
| Happiest Season
| 2020
| Both films revolve around lesbians who plan to come out to their conservative families during the holidays, only to be confronted by their ex-boyfriends; Lez Bomb is set on Thanksgiving while Happiest Season takes place on Christmas.
|-
| Fyre Fraud
| 2019
| Fyre
| 2019
| Both are documentaries about the Fyre Festival.
|-
| A Dog's Journey 
| 2019
| The Art of Racing in the Rain
| 2019
| Both are films about a dog's life in their owner's lives and are narrated and seen through the eyes of the dogs. 
|-
| The Haunting of Sharon Tate 
| 2019
| Once Upon a Time in Hollywood
| 2019
| Both are films about Sharon Tate and her murder. Although the former is a horror thriller film that dramatizes the events, the latter takes place in an alternate universe where the murder did not take place. 
|-
|Portrait of a Lady on Fire
| 2019
|Ammonite
| 2020
|Both films are set around 1800 on the coast of the English Channel and feature a forbidden lesbian relationship further complicated by class differences
|-
|The King's Letters
| 2019
|Forbidden Dream
| 2019
|Both are about King Sejong the Great and his patronage of scholarship.
|-
|Ujda Chaman
| 2019
|Bala
| 2019
|Both Bollywood movies were about men facing premature baldness and hence becoming a subject of social ridicule and facing problems finding a spouse. In fact, the films released only one week apart. The striking similarity between the trailers of both the movies even led to a director filing a petition in court to stall the other's release.
|-
|Never Rarely Sometimes Always
| 2020
|Unpregnant
| 2020
|Both are American films about a teenage girl finding out she is pregnant and going on a road trip with her best friend to another state to get an abortion without their parents' consent.
|-
|Friend of the World
| 2020
|Don't Look Up
| 2021
|Both are science fiction comedy satire films influenced by Dr. Strangelove and The Twilight Zone, involving an apocalyptic event that could have been avoided if not for a corrupt official of the United States.
|-
|Killer Spider
| 2020
|Holy Spider
| 2022
|Both are dramatizations of the case of Saeed Hanaei, a serial killer who targeted sex workers in Iran.
|-
|Pinocchio
| 2022
|Guillermo del Toro's Pinocchio
| 2022
|Both films are based on The Adventures of Pinocchio.
|-
|Violent Night
| 2022
|The Mean One
| 2022
|Also Christmas Bloody Christmas (2022). All are films about a murderous Santa Claus figure.
|-
|Fire of Love
| 2022
|The Fire Within: Requiem for Katia and Maurice Krafft
| 2022
|Both document the life and work of volcanologist and filmmaker couple Katia and Maurice Krafft, making extensive use of their own video footage.
|}

Other meanings

One story from two perspectives 
The term "twin films" has also been used for films produced by the same production company with the purpose of telling the same story from two different points of view:
 Anatomy of a Marriage: My Days with Françoise (1964) and Anatomy of a Marriage: My Days with Jean-Marc (1964) use the same cast to tell the same story from two different points of view.
 The World War II films Flags of Our Fathers (2006) and Letters from Iwo Jima (2006) are about the Battle of Iwo Jima, told from the perspective of United States Marines and Japanese soldiers.

Multiple-language films 
The term "twin films" has also been used for multiple-language versions of films:
 Raavan (2010) and Raavanan (2010) use similar casts filming the scenes in both Hindi and Tamil.

References

Film and video terminology
Films by type